Voices is a studio album by Greek electronic composer Vangelis, released in 1995.

Overview
Caroline Lavelle sings and plays cello on the song "Come To Me", Paul Young sings on "Losing Sleep", while Stina Nordenstam on "Ask the Mountains".

Release
The album reached #58 position in the UK Albums Chart on March 2, 1996. The single "Ask The Mountains" was co-released with Stina Nordenstam, and reached #77 position in the UK Singles Chart on March 16, 1996.

Track listing
"Voices" (Vangelis) – 7:00
"Echoes" (Vangelis) – 8:20
"Come To Me" (Vangelis, Lavelle) – 4:40
"P.S." (Vangelis) – 2:05
"Ask The Mountains" (Vangelis, Nordenstam) – 7:55
"Prelude" (Vangelis) – 4:24
"Losing Sleep (Still, My Heart)" (Vangelis, Young) – 6:41
"Messages" (Vangelis) – 7:30
"Dream In An Open Place" (Vangelis) – 5:50

The music was used in the soundtrack for the 1998 documentary Deep Sea, Deep Secrets co-produced by The Learning Channel and Discovery Channel, together with music from Vangelis next album, Oceanic. 
The track "Ask the Mountains" was used as the background music for the TV commercial by Indesit Company for the Hotpoint-Ariston Aqualtis washing machine in 2006, which won the Lion Award at the Cannes Lions International Festival of Creativity.

Credits
Vangelis – composer, performer
Caroline Lavelle – vocals, cello, lyrics
Stina Nordenstam – vocals, lyrics
Paul Young – vocals, lyrics
Athens Opera Company – vocals on "Voices"

Production
Vangelis — producer, arranger
Philippe Colonna — engineer, mixer
Frederick Rousseau — assistant producer
Stylorouge — design
Jim Freedman — cover photography
Alex Misiewicz — underwater photography

Charts

Certifications

References

1995 albums
Vangelis albums
Atlantic Records albums